Fabio Duque Jaramillo (12 May 1950 – 9 February 2022) was a Colombian Roman Catholic prelate.

Duque Jaramillo was born in Colombia and was ordained to the priesthood in 1975. He served as bishop of the Roman Catholic Diocese of Armenia, Colombia, from 2003 to 2012 and was bishop of the Roman Catholic Diocese of Garzón, Colombia, from 2012 until his death in 2022.

He died on 9 February 2022, at the age of 71.

References

1950 births
2022 deaths
21st-century Roman Catholic bishops in Colombia
Franciscan bishops
People from Armenia, Colombia